If a Tree Falls: A Story of the Earth Liberation Front is a 2011 American documentary film by filmmaker Marshall Curry. It tells the story of activist Daniel G. McGowan of the Earth Liberation Front (ELF), from his first arson attacks in 1996 to his 2005 arrest by the Department of Justice. The film also examines the ethics of the ELF at large and how terrorism is to be defined.

Premiering at the 2011 Sundance Film Festival, If a Tree Falls was rapidly acclaimed by critics as many considered it one of the best documentaries of 2011 for its thought-provoking portrayal of complex environmental and political issues. It won a number of awards, and was nominated for an Academy Award for Best Documentary Feature.

Plot

Daniel McGowan first became involved with the ELF in 1996.

The Department of Justice launched Operation Backfire to find the arsonists.

In 2006, McGowan was arrested.

Signing a plea agreement, he was sentenced to 7 years in prison.

Production
Director Marshall Curry knew Daniel McGowan through his wife's work. McGowan did not strike him as the terrorist type, so after his 2006 arrest, he was intrigued to find out what led him to his radical course of action.

Release
If a Tree Falls: A Story of the Earth Liberation Front premiered at the 2011 Sundance Film Festival, where it won the award for Best Documentary Editing. Oscilloscope Laboratories would subsequently pick it up for theatrical distribution.

PBS broadcast the film on September 13, 2011, as part of its POV series.

Reception
If a Tree Falls has an approval rating of 88% on review aggregator website Rotten Tomatoes, based on 32 reviews, and an average rating of 7.01/10. It also has a score of 65 out of 100 on Metacritic, based on 14 critics, indicating "generally favorable reviews".

Kenneth Turan at the Los Angeles Times called it "one of the best documentaries of the year" and the New York Times said it was "an extraordinary documentary... [a] fearless exploration of complexity in a world drawn to oversimplified depictions of events and problems, heroes and villains."

The various organizations involved—including the spokesman for the Earth Liberation Front and the prosecutor who put members of the E.L.F. in prison—also responded favorably.

Awards
Academy Award, Best Documentary Feature (nominee)
Sundance Film Festival, Best Documentary Editing (winner)
Dallas Film Festival, Environmental Visions Award (winner)
Miami International Film Festival, Knight Dox Competition Grand Jury Prize (nominee)
Miami Film Festival, Knight Dox Competition Special Mention (winner)
Nashville Film Festival, Best Documentary (winner)
Traverse City Film Festival, Founders Award for Best Documentary (winner)
Santa Cruz Film Festival, Earthvision Environmental Jury Prize (winner)
Flagstaff Mountain Film Festival, Best Feature (winner)
Best Documentary Screenplay from the Writers Guild of America (nominee)

References

External links
 
 
 
 If a Tree Falls: A Story of the Earth Liberation Front website on POV
 Press Notes
 Trailer on Vimeo
 The entire film on Internet Archive

2011 films
2011 in the environment
2011 documentary films
American documentary films
Documentary films about American politics
Documentary films about environmental issues
Documentary films about forests and trees
POV (TV series) films
Eco-terrorism
Earth Liberation Front
Films directed by Marshall Curry
2010s English-language films
2010s American films